Korasion, also called Kalon Korakesion, was a town of ancient Cilicia, on the coast a little to the east of Seleucia ad Calycadnum, inhabited during the Roman and Byzantine eras.

Its site is tentatively located near Susanoğlu in Asiatic Turkey.

References

Populated places in ancient Cilicia
Former populated places in Turkey
Roman towns and cities in Turkey
Populated places of the Byzantine Empire
History of Mersin Province